Mehdi Mohammadpour is an Iranian footballer who plays for Nassaji Mazandaran in the Azadegan League.

Club career statistics

References

External links
 
 Mehdi Mohammadpour in varzesh11
 Mehdi Mohammadpour at IRIFF

1985 births
Living people
Iranian footballers
Sportspeople from Tabriz
Shahrdari Ardabil players
Gostaresh Foulad F.C. players
Shahrdari Tabriz players
Machine Sazi F.C. players
Tractor S.C. players
Association football defenders